Jonathan Ezequiel Bustos (born 29 June 1994) is an Argentine professional footballer who plays as a attacking midfielder or winger for Indonesian club Borneo.

Career
Bustos started his career with Huracán. He made his senior debut in Primera B Nacional on 10 December 2011 against Gimnasia y Esgrima, which was followed by his first goal in the succeeding April in a defeat to Deportivo Merlo. A further goal versus Atlanta followed, in a season which he ended with eleven appearances; as well as with his opening senior red card, which occurred in a fixture with Atlético Tucumán. Bustos remained for the subsequent 2012–13 and 2013–14 campaigns, adding nineteen more appearances. On 30 January 2015, Bustos moved to Primera B Metropolitana's Platense. His fourth season ended with promotion.

Career statistics
.

Honours
Platense
Primera B Metropolitana: 2017–18

References

External links

1994 births
Living people
Footballers from Buenos Aires
Argentine footballers
Association football midfielders
Primera Nacional players
Primera B Metropolitana players
Super League Greece players
Liga 1 (Indonesia) players
Club Atlético Huracán footballers
Club Atlético Platense footballers
Athlitiki Enosi Larissa F.C. players
FBC Melgar footballers
Borneo F.C. players
Argentine expatriate footballers
Argentine expatriate sportspeople in Greece
Expatriate footballers in Greece
Argentine expatriate sportspeople in Indonesia
Expatriate footballers in Indonesia